Admire Kasi also known as Addy Kasi is a Zimbabwean gospel music producer and promoter who rose to prominence when he launched the first gospel festival in Zimbabwe, Nguva Yakwana Gospel Concert. His influence was generated when he became an international pastor for ZAOGA church, during that time he launched a lunchtime prayer movement that became popular spreading around Harare CBD in the 90s.

Background
Admire Kasi is a charismatic preacher and the founder of Upperview Ministries International, a Pentecostal ministry headquartered in Harare. He started evangelism in the late 80s with Ezekiel Guti becoming a popular evangelist in the church before forming his ministry in 2003.

In 1993, Admire Kasi formed Gospel Train Records which was the first gospel oriented recording studio in Zimbabwe. He then started the Ezekiel Guti Evangelical Association (EGEA) Gospel Train band in 1994 which worked with Ezekiel Guti during EGEA crusades around Zimbabwe, the band included notable artists Ivy Kombo, Elizabeth Manyowa, Carol Mujokoro, Jackie Madondo, Dereck Mpofu, Toggy Chivaviro, Tambawoga and guitarist Mono Mukundu. He then established Gospel Train Records in the late 90s which was one of the first gospel music record labels in Zimbabwe.

Admire Kasi started Nguva Yakwana Gospel Concert becoming the first music producer to introduce gospel music concerts in Zimbabwe in 1999 and established its first festival in 2000 in the Harare Gardens, the event featured top gospel artists from around Southern Africa mostly South Africa. After the first two events in the Harare Gardens, the festival moved to the Harare International Conference Center which had more capacity to contain the crowd who attended the event annually. In 2003 the show faced some criticism from Christian reporters who thought the show tolerated some foreign morals from what the Christian community in Zimbabwe was used to at that time.
Kasi's concert became one of the first gospel music events to bring international artist who performed at the concert including Rebecca Malope, Thembinkozi Booi, Vuyo Mokoena, Lundi Tyamara and Buhle Nhlangulela. Zimbabwean artists like Mai Patai, Evelyn Mhanga and Toggy Chivaviro had their break though the concert in the early 2000s.

He holds a master in Law from the University of Buckingham and has authored some books including Hello Jonah and From The Womb With God. He was announced by the Herald Zimbabwe's People on The Move as one of the first young executives to manage a large corporation in 1986 when he was appointed ZIMNAT Life Assurance provincial manager.

Nguva Yakwana Gospel Concert
Nguva Yakwana Gospel Concert is a gospel music event that was launched in 2000 by Admire Kasi. The event was held annually from 2000 to 2006 when Kasi relocated to the UK, the concert took a break then reemerged in 2019 when he visited Zimbabwe with Ivy Kombo who is the show organiser. The 2020 and 2021 editions could not be done because of COVID19 regulation.

Nguva Yakwana Part 1, 2000
Nguva Yakwana Part 2, 2001
Nguva Yakwana Explosion, 2002
Nguva Yakwana Festival, 2003
Nguva Yakwana Festival, 2004
Nguva Yakwana Festival, 2005
Nguva Yakwana Festival, 2006
Nguva Yakwana Reloaded 2019

Further read
Studies on the Zimbabwean gospel music industry which includes the impact of Nguva Yakwana Gospel Concert shows that were created by Admire Kasi.

Pentecostal Gospel Music in Zimbabwe
Survival Dynamics and Zimbabwe Music Industry
 Gospel Music in Zimbabwe, University of Pretoria

References

Religion in Zimbabwe
Living people
Year of birth missing (living people)